Juni Chakma is a Bangladeshi national women Kabaddi player who was part of the team that won the bronze medal at the 2010 Asian Games and 2014 Asian Games.

References

External links
 Women's sports in Bangladesh

Living people
Place of birth missing (living people)
Asian Games medalists in kabaddi
Kabaddi players at the 2010 Asian Games
Bangladeshi kabaddi players
Kabaddi players at the 2014 Asian Games
Female kabaddi players
Asian Games bronze medalists for Bangladesh
Medalists at the 2010 Asian Games
Year of birth missing (living people)
Medalists at the 2014 Asian Games